The Jacob T. Walden Stone House is on North Montgomery Street (NY 52) near the intersection with Wait Street in Walden, New York. It was built in the 1730s, around the time the thousand-acre (400 ha) Gatehouse Patent was first sold, and is one of the oldest houses remaining in the area.

In the 1820s, Jacob Treadwell Walden, a successful shipping merchant, came to the area from New York City and saw the potential of the Wallkill River for powering textile mills. With him, he brought Jesse Scofield and Dr. Seth Capron who had expertise in running woolen mills. They formed the Franklin Company to finance mills in Walden and dammed the Wallkill [which runs through the middle of Walden] above the falls, creating a power station that remains in use today.  He resided there with his family beginning in the 1820s until sometime after 1840. (See U.S. Federal Census for 1840) On the waning of the textile mills, he returned to New York City and died there in 1855. The village of Walden, New York bears Jacob Walden's name.

The Jacob T. Walden House houses the Walden Historical Society, and is open to the public as a museum on a limited basis. In 2005, the exterior underwent extensive restoration.

See also
National Register of Historic Places listings in Orange County, New York

References

External links
Official site

Houses completed in the 19th century
Houses on the National Register of Historic Places in New York (state)
Houses in Orange County, New York
National Register of Historic Places in Orange County, New York
Historic house museums in New York (state)
Museums in Orange County, New York
Historical society museums in New York (state)